Burton Hall, also known as the Easton Town Hall, is a historic commercial building located at North Easton, Washington County, New York.  It was built in 1901, and is a one-story, rectangular frame building with Colonial Revival and Classical Revival style design elements.  It has a slate-shingled hip roof and is sheathed in horizontal clapboard.  It was built through efforts of a local philanthropist Isaac A. Burton to serve as a place of assembly for residents of the Town of Easton.

It was added to the National Register of Historic Places in 2015.

References

City and town halls on the National Register of Historic Places in New York (state)
Colonial Revival architecture in New York (state)
Neoclassical architecture in New York (state)
Government buildings completed in 1901
Buildings and structures in Washington County, New York
National Register of Historic Places in Washington County, New York